Dr. Chandra Bhandari (Nepali: डा. चन्द्र भण्डारी) (born Chandra Kant Bhandari, April 14, 1961, in Hunga-7, Gulmi) is a Nepali politician, central member of the Nepali Congress party, and a member of parliament elected in the 2022 legislative election from Gulmi 1.

Bhandari entered politics in 1976 and went on to become the general secretary of Nepal Students Union. In the 2006 revolution, he openly favored republicanism contrary to official party position. He contested the 2013 constituent assembly election from Gulmi-2 and won, defeating his long time rival Pradeep Gyawali by about 2,500 votes. He was defeated by CPN-UML candidate Pradeep Gyawali in the 1999 legislative election, in the 2008 CA Election and again later in the 2017 legislative election. He is considered to be close to Senior Leader Arjun Narasingha KC. In the 2022 Nepalese general election, he was elected as the member of the 2nd Federal Parliament of Nepal.

He had achieved master's degree in sociology and management faculty and was pursuing his PhD, as of 2013.  He later completed his PhD.

References 

1961 births
Living people
Nepali Congress politicians from Lumbini Province
Nepalese Hindus
21st-century Nepalese people
People from Gulmi District
Members of the 2nd Nepalese Constituent Assembly
Nepal MPs 2022–present